Michelangelo Rucci (born 10 November 1963) is an Australian sports journalist, and writer.

Of Italian descent, Rucci grew up in the western suburbs of Adelaide, South Australia, and graduated from Woodville High School. He is a sports writer in Adelaide and was the longest-serving the chief Australian rules football writer for The Advertiser, Adelaide's only daily newspaper.  

Rucci also covered field hockey for News Limited in the 1988 and 2000 Summer Olympics. He also was a consultant to the president of the International Hockey Federation, Etienne Glichitch, in the 1990s, and won the sport's highest honour, the President's Award, in 1997.

In 1999, Rucci published and co-authored Dynasty, the story of legendary Port Adelaide coach Fos Williams and his family's dynasty in football.
In 2022, Rucci was editor of "Chasing The Dream", the book commemorating 50 years of greyhound racing at Angle Park written by Ray Fewings.

The SANFL in 2007 awarded Rucci its Gold Media Award for his outstanding contribution to covering football in South Australia.

The AFL in 2006 appointed Rucci to the selection panel for Australian football's Indigenous Team of the Century. The league also had Rucci as a judge for the Norm Smith Medal at the 1994 and 2005 grand finals, the Michael Tuck Medal at the 2008 and 2011 NAB Cup pre-season grand finals and the Allen Aylett Medal at the 2008 AFL Hall of Fame tribute match at the MCG.  He is also a selector for the South Australian Football Hall of Fame. 

Rucci was added to the Australian Football Hall of Fame selection committee in 2011.

After 22 years at Adelaide radio station 1395FIVEaa, Rucci moved in 2019 to SEN1629SA to co-host the drive-time sports show with Kym Dillon. In the same year, Rucci ended his full-time commitment with The Advertiser after a 37-year stint. He remained as a Saturday columnist and online columnist during the AFL season until April 2020.

In March 2020, Rucci joined the Port Adelaide Football Club as a 'specialist content producer' for the club's website and special publications. Ending a journalistic career spanning over three decades, Rucci now writes propaganda puff-pieces for the Port Adelaide Football Club in an effort to water down the expectations of the supporters, known to be a "thorn in the side" of the league, who since 2012 have controlled the operations of the clubs board. 2012 overhaul of the Port Adelaide Football Club including the sacking of senior coach Matthew Primus and president Brett Duncanson. AFL.com.au. Retrieved on 2022-09-02</ref> 

Rucci joined InDaily as a football analyst in July 2020.

References

1963 births
Living people
Australian people of Italian descent
Writers from Adelaide
Australian sports journalists
Journalists from South Australia